Nesolechia is a genus of parasitic fungi in the family Parmeliaceae. All three species in the genus grow on lichens. Nesolechia probably evolved from a lichen ancestor, as it is closely related to many lichenized species of fungi.

Nesolechia fungi typically develop gall-like structures on their hosts that may be roughly spherical to lobe-like or leafy.

Taxonomy
The genus was circumscribed in 1856 by Italian lichenologist Abramo Bartolommeo Massalongo, with Nesolechia oxyspora assigned as the type species. It contained species formerly placed in Abrothallus that produced ascospores without a septum. He also included N. inquinans, N. thallicola, N. heeri, and N. punctum in the genus; these are now placed in the genera Micarea, Phacopsis, Scutula, and Bachmanniomyces, respectively. In his 1930 work on parasitic fungi, Karl von Keissler included 10 species in Nesolechia.

In 2017, Divakar and colleagues used a then-recently developed "temporal phylogenetic" approach to identify temporal bands for specific taxonomic ranks in the family Parmeliaceae, suggesting that groups of species that diverged within the time window of 29.45–32.55 million years ago represent genera. They proposed to synonymize genus Nesolechia with Punctelia (its lichen-forming sister group), because Nesolechia originated relatively recently and fell under the timeframe threshold for genus level. This proposed synonymy was not accepted in a later critical analysis of the temporal phylogenetic approach for fungal classification.

Species
, Species Fungorum accepts three species in Nesolechia:
Nesolechia doerfeltii 
Nesolechia falcispora 
Nesolechia oxyspora 

Index Fungorum lists 62 taxa that have been named Nesolechia, but as Paul Diederich and colleagues explained in their 2018 review of lichenicolous fungi, "A high morphological plasticity, sometimes correlated with host selection, has led to the description of many poorly characterized taxa", and many of those published names are not accepted by taxonomic authorities, or have been transferred to other genera. The following are taxa previously placed in Nesolechia but now accepted in other genera:

Nesolechia aggregantula  = Carbonea aggregantula
Nesolechia associata  = Geltingia associata
Nesolechia cetrariicola  = Bachmanniomyces punctum
Nesolechia cladoniaria  = Bachmanniomyces punctum
Nesolechia ericetorum  = Rhymbocarpus ericetorum
Nesolechia fusca  = Punctelia oxyspora
Nesolechia heeri  = Scutula heeri
Nesolechia inquinans  = Micarea inquinans
Nesolechia insita  = Steinia geophana
Nesolechia intumescens  = Lambiella insularis
Nesolechia leptostigma  = Geltingia associata
Nesolechia lesdainii  = Unguiculariopsis lesdainii
Nesolechia lichenicola  = Lecidea lichenicola
Nesolechia neglecta  = Rhymbocarpus neglectus
Nesolechia nitschkei  = Skyttea nitschkei
Nesolechia pertusariicola  = Skyttea heterochroae
Nesolechia punctum  = Bachmanniomyces punctum
Nesolechia scabridula  = Llimoniella scabridula
Nesolechia supersparsa  = Carbonea supersparsa
Nesolechia thallicola  = Phacopsis thallicola
Nesolechia vermicularis  = Thamnogalla crombiei
Nesolechia verrucariae  = Toninia verrucariae
Nesolechia vitellinaria  = Carbonea vitellinaria
Nesolechia xenophana  = Cecidonia xenophana

References

Parmeliaceae
Lecanorales genera
Taxa described in 1856
Taxa named by Abramo Bartolommeo Massalongo
Lichenicolous fungi